Mariehamn  is the capital of Åland, an autonomous territory under Finnish sovereignty. Mariehamn is the seat of the Government and Parliament of Åland, and 40% of the population of Åland live in the city. It is mostly surrounded by Jomala, the second largest municipality in Åland in terms of population; to the east it is bordered by Lemland.

The theme of the coat of arms of Mariehamn refers to the city's main livelihood, a maritime transport, and the city's parks, which are typically lined with linden trees. The coat of arms was designed by Nils Byman and confirmed in 1951.

Due to its central location in the Baltic Sea, Mariehamn has become a major summer resort town for global tourism; as many as 1.5 million tourists visit there annually.

History 

The town was named after the Russian empress Maria Alexandrovna (1824–1880), literally meaning "Marie's Port". Mariehamn was founded in 1861, around the village of Övernäs, in what was at the time part of the municipality of Jomala. The city has since expanded and incorporated more of Jomala territory. Mariehamn was built according to a very regular scheme which is well-preserved. One of the oldest streets is Södragatan where many wooden houses dating from the 19th century can be seen.
Following the First World War, Mariehamn was home to the Mariehamn Grain Fleet.

On November 8, 1963, a devastating plane crash occurred in Mariehamn, in which 22 out of 25 people lost their lives, which made it the second-deadliest aviation accident in the history of Finland.

Transportation

Harbours 
The city is located on a peninsula. It has two important harbours, one located on the western shore and one on the eastern shore, which are ice-free for nearly the whole year, and have no tides. The Western Harbour is an important international harbour with daily traffic to Sweden, Estonia and mainland Finland. A powerful incentive for Baltic ferries to stop at Mariehamn is that, with respect to indirect taxation, Åland is not part of the EU customs zone and so duty-free goods can be sold aboard. 
Åland and Mariehamn have a reputable heritage in shipping. The Flying P-Liner Pommern museum ship (part of the Åland Maritime Museum) is anchored in the Western Harbour. The Eastern Harbour features one of the largest marinas in Scandinavia. The famous Dutch steamer Jan Nieveen (now called F.P. von Knorring, after Åland teacher and vicar Frans Peter von Knorring) can also be found here.

Airport 
Mariehamn Airport serves the city; it has scheduled flights on two airlines including Finnair.

Roads 
At three of Åland's four highways, Mariehamn serves as a starting point for Main Road 1 to Eckerö, Main Road 2 to Sund and Main Road 3 to Lumparland.

Culture 
The city is an important centre for Åland media; both of the local newspapers (Ålandstidningen and Nya Åland), several radio stations and the local TV channels (TV Åland and Åland24) operate out of the city. The islanders are traditionally fond of reading, and had public libraries before 1920. A printing works was established in the town in 1891. The municipal library, which was built in 1989, is one of the most interesting modern buildings.

Museums
Åland Maritime Museum
Åland Museum
Pommern (ship)
Övernässtugan
Sjökvarteret

Architecture 
Mariehamn features several buildings drawn by Finnish architect Lars Sonck, who moved to Åland as a child. Buildings drawn by him include the church of Mariehamn (1927), the main building of the Åland Maritime College (1927) and the town hall (1939). Hilda Hongell also designed several buildings, although only a few are still standing.

Demographics

Geography

Climate 
Mariehamn has a transitional climate between humid continental climate (Dfb) with certain maritime (Cfb) influence as a result of the strong maritime moderation from being an island in the Baltic Sea. This causes summers to be cooler than both the Swedish and Finnish mainlands, with winters being similar in cold to the adjacent coastal part of Sweden but milder than Finland's mainland.

Twin towns and sister cities

Mariehamn is twinned with:
 Kópavogur, Iceland
 Kragerø, Norway
 Kuressaare, Estonia
 Lomonosov, Russia
 Slagelse, Denmark
 Tórshavn, Faroe Islands
 Valkeakoski, Finland
 Visby, Sweden

Notable people
Maggie Gripenberg, dancer and choreographer
Henrik Klingenberg, keyboardist, keytarist and singer of Sonata Arctica
Anders Överström, professional footballer
Ville Salminen, film actor and director
Olivia Ulenius, footballer
Tommy Wirtanen, semi-professional footballer

Gallery

See also 
 Fredrikshamn

References

External links 

  
 Official Tourist Gateway of Mariehamn - Maarianhamina
 
 Map of Mariehamn
 Mariehamn. Tourist route 

 
Cities and towns in Finland
Populated coastal places in Finland
Municipalities of Åland
Grand Duchy of Finland
Populated places established in 1861
Port cities and towns of the Baltic Sea
Seaside resorts in Finland
1861 establishments in Finland